Joaquim Brandão Gomes, also known as "Kikas", (born December 23, 1980) is a retired Angolan professional basketball player. He has played professionally in Germany and the Netherlands.

A  in height, 100 kg (220 pounds) in weight center-power forward, Gomes was a stand out at Valparaiso University in Indiana, United States, where he played from 2000 to 2004.  In 2005, he won the German basketball cup with RheinEnergie Köln. He also played for his country's national team in the 2004 Summer Olympics, 2006 FIBA World Championship, FIBA Africa Championship 2007.

He retired in 2017 at the age of 36, and was appointed sporting director at his longtime club 1º de Agosto.

College career 
Gomes played college basketball in the United States for Valparaiso. He had a career-high 23 points in the final of the Mid-Continent Conference tournament in the Crusaders' 75–70 win over IUPUI on March 9, 2004.

Professional career

Petro de Luanda (1998–2000) 
Gomes started his career with Petro de Luanda of the Angolan Basketball League where he played two seasons before moving to the United States.

RheinEnergie Köln (2004–2005) 
In the 2004–05 season, Gomes played with RheinEnergie Köln of the Germann Basketball Bundesliga. He averaged 5.2 points and 3.0 rebounds in 28 games.

EiffelTowers Den Bosch (2005–2006) 
Gomes played for EiffelTowers Den Bosch and averaged 10.4 points and 8.2 rebounds per game. He helped EiffelTowers win the Eredivisie championship.

Primeiro de Agosto (2006–2016) 
Fromm 2006 to 2016, Gomes played ten seasons with Primeiro de Agosto of the Angolan Basketball League. He won five national championships and the FIBA Africa Club Champions Cup six times.

Achievements
Petro de Luanda

 Angolan Basketball League: (1999)
 Taça de Angola: (2000)

RheinEnergie Köln

 BBL-Pokal: (2005)

EiffelTowers Den Bosch

 Eredivisie: (2006)

Primeiro de Agosto

 5× Angolan Basketball League: (2008, 2009, 2010, 2013, 2016)
 3× Angolan Basketball Cup: (2008, 2009, 2012)

 6× FIBA Africa Club Champions Cup: (2007, 2008, 2009, 2010, 2012, 2013)

Angola

 AfroBasket : (2005, 2007, 2009, 2013)

Individual awards 

 2× AfroBasket MVP: (2007, 2009)
 2× FIBA Africa Club Champions Cup MVP: (2008, 2010)
 4× FIBA Africa Club Champions Cup All-Star Team: (2007, 2008, 2010, 2013)
 Angolan Basketball League MVP: (2010)

See also
Angola national basketball team

References

External links
 
"Angola Basketball Comes Far Since 1992"
"Angolan Men National Team"
Gomes Named to Angola's Olympic Team
Player profile 
Africabasket profile

1980 births
Living people
Angolan expatriate basketball people in Germany
Angolan expatriate basketball people in the Netherlands
Angolan expatriate basketball people in the United States
Angolan men's basketball players
Atlético Petróleos de Luanda basketball players
Basketball players at the 2004 Summer Olympics
Basketball players at the 2008 Summer Olympics
C.D. Primeiro de Agosto men's basketball players
Centers (basketball)
Heroes Den Bosch players
Olympic basketball players of Angola
Power forwards (basketball)
Basketball players from Luanda
Valparaiso Beacons men's basketball players
2014 FIBA Basketball World Cup players
2010 FIBA World Championship players
2006 FIBA World Championship players
2002 FIBA World Championship players
Angolan expatriate sportspeople in Germany